The Morea revolt of 1453–1454 was a failed peasant rebellion carried out against the rule of the brothers Thomas and Demetrios Palaiologos, rulers of the Byzantine Despotate of the Morea in the Peloponnese peninsula.

Background

The Byzantine Empire had ruled over the Morea for centuries before the rebellion. During this time, several thousand Arvanites had settled in the area. After the Battle of Varna in 1444, the Ottoman Turks had a free hand in dealing with the remnants of the Byzantine Empire, which had been in decline for over a century. In 1446, the Ottomans invaded the Byzantine Morea which was then jointly administrated by the two brothers, the Despots Constantine and Thomas Palaiologos. The brothers successfully resisted the invasion, but at the cost of devastating the countryside of the Morea, and the Turks carrying off 60,000 Greek civilians back to their territory. Murad II, the Ottoman Sultan, concluded a peace treaty which resulted in the brothers paying a heavy tribute to the Turks, accepting vassalage to them and a promise not to oppose them in the future, for Murad had to deal with his own internal conflicts elsewhere.

Upon the death of Byzantine Emperor John VIII Palaiologos in Constantinople in October 1448, the imperial throne fell to Constantine, who was crowned on 6 January 1449 in Mystras before departing for the capital. Two months later, he assumed his new role in Constantinople as Emperor Constantine XI. His younger brothers, Thomas and Demetrius remained in charge of the Morea as joint Despots in his place. Despite assurances to Constantine that they would pledge support to one another, both Thomas and Demetrius coveted the other's lands – in addition, they pressed claims against Venetian port possessions in the Morea, alienating the only power capable of aiding them in resisting the Turks. The mutual hostility went to the point that both despots requested military aid from the Turks against the other. During the final siege of Constantinople, the new Sultan, Mehmed II invaded the Morea again as a distraction to prevent the brothers sending any provisions to Constantinople.

The revolt
Shortly after the fall of Constantinople and the death of the last Byzantine Emperor Constantine XI, 30,000 Albanians under Peter Bua rose in revolt against the two brothers, Thomas and Demetrius II, due to the chronic insecurity and tribute payment to the Turks. The Albanians were later joined by the local Greeks, who by then had a common leader in Manuel Kantakouzenos. Kantakouzenos was hailed as their common Despot, and the rebels asked for Venetian help, while the two brothers asked for Mehmed's help in putting down the rebellion. The situation was further confused by a second rebellion led by Giovanni Asen Zaccaria, the son of the last Prince of Achaea Centurione II Zaccaria, who claimed his father's title representing the remains of the Latin element in the Morea. Before the rebellion, Zaccaria had been imprisoned by Thomas but managed to escape during the confusion.

As the Sultan's vassals, the despots called upon Turkish aid, and Omar, the son of the Ottoman governor of Thessaly Turakhan Beg arrived in December 1453. After scoring a victory against the rebels, he departed, having secured the release of his brother Ahmed, who had been captured by the Byzantines in 1446. The revolt did not subside however, and in October 1454 Turakhan himself was forced to intervene. After sacking a few fortresses, the rebellious populace capitulated. Turakhan advised the two Palaiologoi to settle their differences and rule well, and then departed the peninsula. Tribute was reinstated to the same levels and the Despots were to continue their vassalage as before. As for the rebel leaders, Boua was pardoned by Mehmet and later became a spokesperson for the Albanian people, Zaccaria fled and ended up as a pensioner in Venice and later the Papal Court, while Kantakouzenos escaped and disappeared from history.

References

Sources
Nicolas Cheetham, Mediaeval Greece, Yale University Press, New Havan & London (1981) 

George Ostrogorsky, History of the Byzantine State, Rutgers University Press, New Jersey, (1969) 
 

1450s in the Byzantine Empire
1453 in Europe
1454 in Europe
15th-century rebellions
Byzantine–Ottoman wars
Greek rebellions
Peasant revolts
Popular revolt in late-medieval Europe
Despotate of the Morea
Conflicts in 1453
Conflicts in 1454
Albanian rebellions